Solomon Islands competed at the 2011 Pacific Games in Nouméa, New Caledonia between August 27 and September 10, 2011. The team consisted of 248 competitors competed .

Athletics

Solomon Islands qualified eight athletes.

Men
Casper Mabe
Masick Tena
Chris Votu

Women
Hilda Alavani
Betty Babalu
Sharon Firisua
Hilda Mabe
Dianah Matekali

Basketball

Solomon Islands qualified a men's team.

Men
Alexander Mataki McFaden
Allen Wanefai
Brian Fatai
David Kivo
Gavin Basiori Bare
Goldie Franklyn Kari
Hilton Maetarau Gwali
Philip Tuhaika
Samuel Gwali
Timirthy Tigs Goulolo
Uriel Lakani Matanani
Waige Turueke

Bodybuilding

Solomon Islands qualified seven athletes.

Men
Amos Sui
John Medo
Godwin Rikimae
John Paul -  -70 kg
Philip Lawumane
David Tom Dan
Emilio Keniroko

Boxing

Solomon Islands qualified five athletes.

Men
Paul Kava -  -49 kg
Alosio Arabatu -  -52 kg
Teloave Benedict
James Tekoa Teube
John Kaloka

Football

Solomon Islands qualified a men's and women's team.

Men -  Team Tournament
Shadrack Ramoni
Hardies Aengari
Timothy Joe
Tome Faisi
Samson Takayama
Nelson Sale
Michael Fifi
George Suri
Benjamin Totori
Joe Lui
Ian Paia
Joe Manu
Mostyn Beui
Jeffery Bule
Seni Ngava
James Naka
Abraham Iniga
Henry Fa'arodo
Joses Nawo
Dida Qwaina

Women
Betty Sade
Rose Gwali
Margaret Belo
Brenda Masae
Audrey Galo
Mesalyn Saepio
Alice Olomane
Ileen Pegi
Berry Maenu'u
Prudence Fula
Laydah Samani
Ella Misibini
Belinda Susana
Mary Maefiti
Everlyn Asibara
Vanessa Inifiri
Sally Saeni
Crystal Bwakolo
Geli Annie

Golf

Solomon Islands qualified six athletes.

Men
Thomas Felani
Ben Felani
George Rukako

Women
Luisa Balekana
Everlyn Maelasi
Norma Jans Woperes

Judo

Solomon Islands qualified eight athletes.

Men
Fred Kabolo
Tony Tome
Selson John Kabolo
Tony Lomo
Jackson Junior Lui
Abraham Morgan
Kinsley Vui
Mauatu Teulilake Samasoni

Karate

Solomon Islands qualified six athletes.

Men
Frengy Bisoka
Ron Maefasia Uate'e -  84 kg and Over
Selwyn Kuru -  Open
Christian Kabei
Christopher Ariatewa

Women
Janet Lydia Gwai -  -68 kg

Rugby Sevens

Solomon Islands  qualified a men's team.

Men
Robert Boss
Roman Tongaka
Jeffery Ma'Ungatu'u
Stewart Ba'Iabe
Eugene Taimagino
Leslie Ngiumoana Puia
Cameron Suamoana
Steve Tepuke Moana
Felix Galo Solomon
Jonathan Maitaki Kaitu'u
Vivi Frank Kelesi
Baptist Ephrem Kelesi

Table Tennis

Solomon Islands qualified three athletes.

Men
Rob Dorovolomo
Gary Nuopula
Jeremy Dorovolomo

Taekwondo

Solomon Islands qualified nine athletes.

Men
Clody Winston Poko -  Team Tournament
Derick Afu -  -63 kg,  Team Tournament
Samson Kwalea -  -74 kg,  Team Tournament
Clyde Sade Rika -  -87 kg
Maetia Junior
Wilson Saii -  -68 kg
David Sulumae -  Team Tournament

Women
Mavete Mase -  -58 kg
Emily Magaret Kwoaetolo

Tennis

Solomon Islands qualified four athletes.

Men
Luke Paeni
Michael Leong -  Single Tournament
Samuel Tesimu

Women
Amanda Korinnihona

Triathlon

Solomon Islands  qualified three athletes.

Men
Leban Lokata
Stanley Ofasisili
Alphones Waletitike

Volleyball

Beach Volleyball

Solomon Islands qualified a men's team.

Men
John Kaitu Sione
James Waneasi

Weightlifting

Solomon Islands qualified six athletes.

Men
Ramoaka Brown
David Gorosi
Ilaniume Finau

Women
Kalibiu Arina
Jenly Tegu Wini -  -58 kg Clean & Jerk,  -58 kg Snatch,  -58 kg Total
Diana Waikori

References

2011 in Solomon Islands sport
Nations at the 2011 Pacific Games
Solomon Islands at the Pacific Games